Three Rivers Academy is a mixed, secondary school situated on Hersham Road, between Hersham and Walton-on-Thames in Surrey, England. The school has been awarded Specialist Business and Enterprise College status.

Houses

The school runs a system of four houses named after local areas; Claremont, Hampton, Richmond and Windsor. Claremont was the first house to win sports day, as well as the house point cup, since the house system was introduced. Windsor currently hold the Sports Day (2018).  The Rydens logo represented each of the houses; a stag on the green background for Claremont, a swan on the blue background for Hampton, a lion on the red background for Richmond and a hawk on the yellow background for Windsor. The Three Rivers Academy logo is a boat above three waves of water.

The school's official motto is "Bringing out the best".

Change from "Rydens School" to "RES"

Following an Ofsted inspection in 2009, the school was rated 'Good with Outstanding Features' and became eligible to become a new style Academy. The governors and Head Teacher decided to move forward with the change of status and opted to rename at the same time. The Rydens name remained, but the abbreviation RES became the official name, standing for Rydens Enterprise School. The school opened as RES for the 2011 Autumn term and was officially opened by local MP Dominic Raab.

Change to Three Rivers Academy
In May 2017 it was announced that as of September 2017 the school would be called Three Rivers Academy after the three local rivers - River Thames, River Mole and River Wey.

In February 2018 students moved into a new £40 million building. On 26 June 2018 the new building was officially opened by Maggie Aderin-Pocock.

Three Rivers Academy Sixth Form College

Three Rivers Academy Sixth Form College is the school's sixth form.The sixth form runs a highly successful and improving sixth form, whose annual Rag Week is a highlight of the school calendar, with the Rag Week held in October 2012, raising £2,448, split between Surrey Air Ambulance and Heavenly Stars. Three Rivers have had three of its graduates eventually go on to study at Oxbridge over 7 years.

Notable alumni
Monte Lynch – Former Surrey and England cricketer
Andy Sayer – Former professional footballer
Steve Finnieston – Former professional footballer
Andy Beckwith – Actor
Edward Highmore – Actor
Stuart Hazeldine – Film writer and director
Chris Rose – Wildlife artist
Jimmy Pursey – Punk rock singer
Matt Barnes – You Me At Six Bassist
Lauren Rammell – Four of Diamonds singer.
Luke Shaw – Professional footballer for Manchester United and England
Harry Anderson – Professional footballer for Lincoln City
Rebeka Simon – Olympic sprint canoer
Edward Chan – Ballroom dancer and billionaire

References

External links
 

Academies in Surrey
Educational institutions established in 1956
Secondary schools in Surrey
1956 establishments in England